Hindu Temple of Bloomington-Normal is a Hindu Temple located in Bloomington, Illinois and serves the Hindu population of the Bloomington-Normal Metropolitan Area. It is located at 1815 Tullamore Ave, in Bloomington, Illinois. The Temple serves the 5,000 Hindus in the area.

History
Since 1978, the Hindu population of Bloomington-Normal had planned to build a permanent Hindu temple for the Bloomington-Normal area. In 2006, an organization for the Hindu Temple of Bloomington-Normal was created to facilitate the creation of the Hindu Temple and fundraising. In 2007, a website was created for the Hindu Temple. In 2009, the temple acquired 2.75 acres and began the process of purification of the land. The temple was given a building permit for $700,000 in June 2013. In April 2014, the Hindu Temple was finally built and opening ceremonies were held.

Design
The Hindu Temple was designed to be non-sectarian and multi-use. The Hindu Temple has a conference room, kitchen, dining area, stage, library and several rooms dedicated to teach Sunday School, Yoga and Indian cultural classes. Since it is non-sectarian, several of the Hindu gods are from different sects and regions of India. There is also a space dedicated for Jains to worship at.

References

Buildings and structures in McLean County, Illinois
Hinduism in the United States
Religious buildings and structures completed in 2014
2014 establishments in Illinois
Religious organizations established in 2006
Asian-American culture in Illinois
Indian-American culture in Illinois